Jason Mitchell (born January 5, 1987) is an American actor. Mitchell started his career acting in minor roles in films such as the action-thriller Contraband (2012), and the neo-noir Broken City (2013). He is best known for portraying rapper Eazy-E in the 2015 biopic Straight Outta Compton. The film is considered his career breakthrough, for which he received numerous award nominations including the Screen Actors Guild Award for Outstanding Ensemble Cast in a Motion Picture. Mitchell has also appeared in the Key and Peele comedy film Keanu (2016), the Netflix film Barry (2016), James Franco's The Disaster Artist (2017), and the blockbuster Kong: Skull Island (2017). He has also appeared in critically acclaimed film such as Kathryn Bigelow's crime drama Detroit (2017), Dee Rees' historical drama Mudbound (2017) and Janicza Bravo's black comedy Zola (2021).

Mitchell is also known for his television roles, making guest appearances in the Amazon Studios limited series Philip K. Dick's Electric Dreams (2018), Alan Yang's dark comedy series Forever acting alongside Hong Chau.  Starting in 2018 he was cast in Lena Waithe's Showtime series The Chi until 2019 when he was accused of multiple allegations of misconduct and subsequently fired from the show. He was also dropped by several talent agencies.

Career
Mitchell had his film debut in 2011 as a 7-Eleven cashier in the crime film Texas Killing Fields. He continued acting in minor roles such as the action-thriller Contraband (2012) starring Mark Wahlberg, and the political neo-noir Broken City (2013) starring Russell Crowe and Wahlberg.

In 2014, Mitchell made his film breakthrough when he was cast as Compton rapper Eazy-E in the F. Gary Gray directed biopic Straight Outta Compton, with his performance being met with significant praise by critics. He received multiple awards nominations including the Screen Actors Guild Award for Outstanding Performance by a Cast in a Motion Picture. In 2016, he appeared in Keanu, which starred Keegan-Michael Key and Jordan Peele, and in the Netflix biopic about Barack Obama.

In 2017 starred as a Vietnam War officer in the blockbuster monster movie, Kong: Skull Island. That same year he also appeared in James Franco's comedy film The Disaster Artist. He also starred in two critically acclaimed films, Kathryn Bigelow's crime drama Detroit starring John Boyega, Kaitlyn Dever, and Will Poulter and Dee Rees' historical drama Mudbound. For the later he received the Independent Spirit Robert Altman Award and the Gotham Award for Outstanding Ensemble Performance along the cast which included Carey Mulligan, Jason Clarke, Jonathan Banks, and Mary J. Blige. Mitchell also received his second Screen Actors Guild Award for Outstanding Ensemble Cast in a Motion Picture nomination.

Michell has also made appearances in television including in the Amazon Studios limited series Philip K. Dick's Electric Dreams (2017) where he appeared in the episode, "Kill all Others". He also appeared in the Alan Yang created dark comedy series Forever (2018) starring in the episode "Andre and Sarah", playing Andre with Hong Chau playing Sarah. The episode was critically acclaimed for its storytelling and performances. In 2018, Mitchell starred in the Lena Waithe's Showtime drama series The Chi, but did not return for a third season due to his misconduct allegations.

Controversies

Sexual misconduct allegations
In May 2019, Mitchell was fired from The Chi when showrunner Ayanna Floyd Davis and co-star Tiffany Boone accused him of sexual misconduct. Boone was among many actresses who "made repeated complaints of sexual harassment" against Mitchell and said she felt "unsafe" around him.

While creator and showrunner Lena Waithe claimed that Mitchell had never acted inappropriately towards her, she knew of the allegations after filming had wrapped on season one of The Chi. Waithe reportedly sought preemptive and corrective measures to handle the situation. She stated that there had been extensive sexual harassment training on set and that she confronted Mitchell about the allegations by saying, "There was definitely a conversation where I called him and got really real". Waithe alleged the harassment and misconduct allegations continued into season two despite the corrective measures taken.

Mitchell denied the multiple allegations of sexual harassment and misconduct against him saying, "I'm all for the Me Too movement...but I think in this situation, [Floyd Davis] tried to use it as a really, really ugly weapon". Mitchell was subsequently fired from the Netflix film Desperados, and was dropped by United Talent Agency and Authentic Talent & Literary Management.

Criminal charges
Mitchell was arrested on April 22, 2020, on multiple counts, including "possession of a controlled substance with intent to distribute and possession of a firearm by a felon." Officers searched his SUV and found about 2 pounds of marijuana with a bag of 1,300 dosage units of Ecstasy. Deputies also found an AK-47 firearm and a Glock 9mm pistol with extended magazines. Mitchell was released after posting a $150,000 surety bond.

Filmography

Film

Television

Awards and nominations

References

External links

 

1987 births
Living people
African-American male actors
American male film actors
Male actors from New Orleans
21st-century African-American people
20th-century African-American people